Kenneth Durham (died 6 August 2016) was a British schoolteacher, educationalist, and headmaster of University College School (1996-2013).

Durham was educated at St John's School, Leatherhead and studied at Brasenose College, Oxford. He taught economics at St. Albans School, before becoming Director of Studies and Head of Economics at King's College School, Wimbledon.  In 1996 he was appointed Headmaster of University College School, which is part of the Eton Group of independent schools.

He was the brother of Geoffrey Durham, the British comedy magician and actor who was married to writer and comedian Victoria Wood.

He wrote several books on Economics education.

He died after a long illness on 6 August 2016 at the age of 62.

Headmasters' and Headmistresses' Conference

He was a member of the GSA/HMC Professional Development Sub-Committee and Chairman of the Headmasters' and Headmistresses' Conference (HMC). He was also a co-opted member of the HMC committee in 2006-7, being HMC Head of Professional Development.

Selected publications
 Durham, K. (1992). The New City. Houndmills, Basingstoke, Hampshire: Macmillan.

References

Alumni of Brasenose College, Oxford
Headmasters of University College School
Schoolteachers from Surrey
2016 deaths
People educated at St John's School, Leatherhead
Year of birth missing
Heads of schools in England
Honorary Fellows of the British Academy